Frozen is a 2013 American computer-animated musical fantasy film produced by Walt Disney Animation Studios as their 53rd film. Loosely based on Hans Christian Andersen's fairy tale The Snow Queen (1844), it was directed by Chris Buck and Jennifer Lee, and written by Lee, Buck, and Shane Morris. Produced by Peter Del Vecho, the film stars the voices of Kristen Bell, Idina Menzel, Josh Gad, Jonathan Groff and Santino Fontana. Frozen follows princess Anna as she guides Kristoff, his reindeer Sven, and the snowman Olaf to find her estranged sister Elsa, whose icy powers have inadvertently trapped their kingdom in eternal winter.

Frozen premiered in Los Angeles on November 19, 2013, and was theatrically released on November 27. Made on a production budget of $150million, it earned $1.282billion worldwide, finishing its theatrical run as the highest-grossing film of 2013, the fifth-highest-grossing film of all time, and the highest-grossing animated film of all time from March 2014 to August 2019. On the review aggregator website Rotten Tomatoes, the film holds an approval rating of  based on  reviews.

The film and its soundtrack have received various awards and nominations. Frozen garnered two Golden Globe Awards at the 71st ceremony. It won four of ten nominations at the 41st Annie Awards. At the 86th Academy Awards, the film received two Oscar nominations, including Best Original Song (for "Let It Go"), and won for Best Animated Feature, the first for Walt Disney Animation Studios. Various critic circles have also picked Frozen as the best animated feature film of the year.

Accolades

See also
 List of accolades received by Frozen II

Notes

References

External links
 

Disney-related lists
Frozen (franchise)
Lists of accolades by film